The Minnesota Renaissance Festival is a Renaissance fair, an interactive outdoor event which focuses on recreating the look and feel of a fictional 16th Century "England-like" fantasy kingdom. It operates during seven consecutive weekends, from mid-August until the final week in September (or sometimes the first weekend in October) on a site near the Minnesota River in Shakopee, a suburb of the Twin Cities.

The Minnesota Renaissance Festival began on September 11, 1971, with Tovah Feldshuh as the Queen, on a  field in Jonathan, Minnesota. More than 25,000 people visited the two-weekend grand opening of the festival, at which time it was called Minnesota Renaissance Fair (changed to Minnesota Renaissance Festival later on) and promoted as “A Celebration of Nature, Art and Life!” It was at the Jonathan site in 1971 and 1972. In 1973, it moved to a 
farm on highway 41 up the hill [north] from Chaska, according to info on page 17 of the book "The History of the American Renaissance Festival" by Al Olson, published in 2021. In 1974, it moved to its current site in Shakopee, where it continues as one of the oldest and largest Renaissance festivals in the United States. It has played host to the early careers of such national acts as the magicians Penn & Teller and The Flying Karamazov Brothers juggling troupe, and it currently hosts acts such as Zilch the Torysteller, Puke and Snot, Johnny Phoenix, The Tortuga Twins, and The Danger Committee. On August 19, 1975, Penn & Teller did their first show together at the Minnesota Renaissance Festival. Jason Mraz also worked as a pickle boy (a boy or man who sells pickles) early in his performance career.

The festival features over 700 entertainers, 275 crafters, and 120 food booths.  Another popular feature is the Feast of Fantasy.

The Minnesota Renaissance Festival is one of several such events in the United States owned and operated by Mid-America Festivals, and it has grown to be one of the largest Renaissance Festivals in the United States, with an annual attendance of 300,000.

Because the land on which the festival was built is leased, in 2014 Mid-America Festivals announced that 2016 would likely be the last season in its current location.  The lease contains a clause in which the owners can terminate the lease at any time.  In 2016 Mid-America Festivals announced the lease term would expire in 2019.  Currently, several sites are under consideration, including properties in other parts of Scott County and near Belle Plaine, Minnesota.

In December 2018 it was announced that the lease for the current site was extended thru the 2020 season.

On August 19, 2020, it was stated on the Minnesota Renaissance Festival Facebook page that the 2020 season, which would have been the 50th season, was cancelled due to covid, and that the 2021 season will now be considered the 50th season.  It was also stated that the lease for the current site was extended thru the 2021 season, though no new updates regarding the proposed new permanent site have been made since it was announced in March 2019 that a site in or near Jordan, Minnesota was probable, and that land near the Scott County Fairgrounds had been purchased for that purpose.

On December 31, 2020, it was stated on the Minnesota Renaissance Festival Facebook page that the lease for the current site was extended thru the 2022 season.

Travel to the Festival 

The Minnesota Renaissance Festival provides free parking at its site in Shakopee and directions from its website.  Parking is available in two parking lots accessible by a single dirt road crossing active train tracks onto its 400-acre campus.  Limited access to and from the festival site has led to significant transportation issues including delays as long as two hours either entering or leaving the fairgrounds. Traffic problems have created significant backups and delays along Minnesota Highway 169 with traffic being identified as the number one issue.

In the 1980s, the Minnesota Transportation Museum provided train trips to the Renaissance Festival using Northern Pacific 328. These trains used Chicago & North Western Railway tracks between Minneapolis and Merriam Junction, which is located next to the Renaissance Festival grounds. The rail line was severed between Hopkins and Chaska in 1991.

See also 
 List of Renaissance fairs
 Reenactment
 Jousting
 Society for Creative Anachronism
 List of open air and living history museums in the United States

References

External links 
Minnesota Renaissance Festival

Festivals in Minnesota
Festivals established in 1971
Tourist attractions in Scott County, Minnesota
Renaissance fairs
1971 establishments in Minnesota